Old St. Peter's Church and Old Cemetery, also known as St. Peter's Church of Cortlandt is a historic Episcopal church and cemetery at Oregon Road and Locust Avenue in Van Cortlandtville, Westchester County, New York. The church was built in 1766 and measures 28 feet by 36 feet.  It is a wood-frame building sheathed in clapboards and was restored in 1964.  The nearby Elmsford Reformed Church was built in 1793 and is a close replica.

The church served as a military hospital during 1781–1782.  The cemetery includes graves of eight French soldiers, from Rochambeau's army, who died there.

The property was added to the National Register of Historic Places in 1973 with reference number 73001292. In an "additional documentation approval" listing, for the same reference number, the National Register included more information about the property in an expanded listing, in 2004.  The documentation itself, dated 2003, describes one contributing site (the cemetery) and one contributing object, in addition to the already listed one contributing building of the property.

See also
 National Register of Historic Places listings in northern Westchester County, New York

References

External links
 NYGenWeb, Westchester County, NY: Sandstones of Van Cortlandtville Cemetery, Cortlandt Manor, NY, Compiled by Jean Ann Orser Lupinetti

Episcopal church buildings in New York (state)
Churches on the National Register of Historic Places in New York (state)
Cemeteries on the National Register of Historic Places in New York (state)
National Register of Historic Places in Westchester County, New York
Churches completed in 1766
Churches in Westchester County, New York
Cemeteries in Westchester County, New York
18th-century Episcopal church buildings